William Charman (23 September 1850 – 8 December 1924) was an English cricketer. He played one first-class match for Surrey in 1875.

See also
 List of Surrey County Cricket Club players

References

External links
 

1850 births
1924 deaths
English cricketers
Surrey cricketers
Cricketers from Epsom